Hilary or Hillary may refer to:

 Hillary Clinton, American politician
 Hillary Coast, Antarctica
 Hilary (name), or Hilarie or Hillary, a given name and surname
 Hilary term, the spring term at the Universities of Oxford and Dublin
 Hikari no Densetsu, a 1985 manga series, known in Italian as Hilary
 Hurricane Hilary, the name of several storms
 Hillary (film), a 2020 American documentary film about Hillary Clinton
 HMS Hilary

See also 
 Hillery (disambiguation)
 Saint Hilary (disambiguation)
 Saint-Hilaire (disambiguation)
 Ilar (disambiguation), Welsh form of the name Hilary
 Eleri (disambiguation), Welsh form of the name Hilarus
 Hillarys, Western Australia